Genspace is a non-profit organization and a community biology laboratory located in Brooklyn, New York. Stemming from the hacking, biohacking, and DIYbio movements, Genspace has focused (since 2009) on supporting citizen science and public access to biotechnology. Genspace opened a Biosafety Level One laboratory in December 2010. Since its opening, Genspace has supported projects, events, courses, art, and general community resources concerning biology, biotechnology, synthetic biology, genetic engineering, citizen science, open source software, open source hardware, and more.

A collaboration between Genspace and Cold Spring Harbor Laboratory earned a second place win from the American Society for Microbiology's 2015 AgarArt competition.

Gallery

References

External links

 Official website
 Biosafety in Microbiological and Biomedical Laboratories (BMBL) 5th Edition
 Genspace on Hackerspaces.org

Non-profit organizations based in New York (state)
Public laboratories
2009 establishments in New York City